Events in 1996 in animation.

Events

January
 January 7: The Simpsons episode "Team Homer" is first broadcast.
 January 14: The Simpsons episode "Two Bad Neighbors" is first broadcast where Homer Simpson and George H. W. Bush collide, as well as the debut of Disco Stu.
 January 19: The first episode of Detective Conan, aka Case Closed, is broadcast.

February 
 February 4: The Simpsons episode "Scenes from the Class Struggle in Springfield" is first broadcast, guest starring Tom Kite and having the debut of Brandine Spuckler.
 February 11: The Simpsons episode "Bart the Fink" is first broadcast, guest starring Bob Newhart. 
 February 18: The Simpsons episode "Lisa the Iconoclast" is first broadcast, guest starring Donald Sutherland. 
 February 25: The Simpsons episode "Homer the Smithers" is first broadcast.

March
 March 9: The final season of Sailor Moon, Sailor Moon Sailor Stars, airs on TV Asahi.
 March 17: The Simpsons episode "The Day the Violence Died" is first broadcast, guest starring Kirk Douglas, Suzanne Somers and Jack Sheldon.
 March 24: The Simpsons episode "A Fish Called Selma" is first broadcast, guest starring Jeff Goldblum. 
 March 25: 68th Academy Awards:
 Nick Park's Wallace and Gromit short film A Close Shave wins the Academy Award for Best Animated Short.
 Colors of the Wind from Pocahontas by Stephen Schwartz and Alan Menken wins the Academy Award for Best Original Song, while the soundtrack from that same film wins the Academy Award for Best Original Score.
 Chuck Jones receives an Academy Honorary Award for his entire career.
 March 31: The Simpsons episode "Bart on the Road" is first broadcast.

April
 April 2: The first episode of Dennis and Gnasher is broadcast.
 April 12: Henry Selick releases James and the Giant Peach, based on Roald Dahl's 1961 eponymous novel.
 April 14: The Simpsons episode "22 Short Films About Springfield" is first broadcast, featuring the famous Steamed Hams scene.
 April 28: 
 The first episode of Dexter's Laboratory airs.
 The Simpsons episode "Raging Abe Simpson and His Grumbling Grandson in 'The Curse of the Flying Hellfish'" is first broadcast.

May
 May 5: The Simpsons episode "Much Apu About Nothing" is first broadcast.
 May 19:
 The Simpsons episode "Homerpalooza" is first broadcast, guest starring The Smashing Pumpkins, Cypress Hill, Sonic Youth and Peter Frampton.
 The Simpsons episode "Summer of 4 Ft. 2" is first broadcast, guest starring Christina Ricci. It’s the first time that two new episodes are broadcast on the same day.

June
 June 21: The Walt Disney Company releases The Hunchback of Notre Dame, directed by Gary Trousdale and Kirk Wise.

July
 July: The Japanese animation studio Brain's Base is founded.

August
 August 14: The first episode of Stickin' Around airs.

September
 September 3: The first episode of Quack Pack airs.
 September 6: The first episode of Superman: The Animated Series airs.
 September 8: The first episode of Blue's Clues airs.
 September 10: The first episode of Billy the Cat airs.
 September 28: In The Dana Carvey Show a recurring animated segment is introduced, The Ambiguously Gay Duo, which will eventually become a part of Saturday Night Live.

October
 October 7: 
 Discovery Kids launches, the network which is a spin-off of Discovery Channel that primarily offered adventure, nature, and science-themed programs aimed towards a children's audience.
 The first episodes of Arthur and Hey Arnold! are broadcast.
 October 27: The Simpsons episode "Treehouse of Horror VII" is first broadcast and ridicules the U.S. presidential elections, caricaturing the candidates Bill Clinton and Bob Dole. It is the first episode of the eighth season and the first season premiere to be a Treehouse of Horror episode.

November
 November 2: The final episode of Teenage Mutant Ninja Turtles is broadcast.
 November 3: The Simpsons episode "You Only Move Twice" is first broadcast, guest starring Albert Brooks. 
 November 10: The Simpsons episode "The Homer They Fall" is first broadcast, guest starring Michael Buffer and Paul Winfield.
 November 15: Space Jam, a crossover between basketball icon Michael Jordan and the Looney Tunes characters, is released in theaters.
 November 17: The Simpsons episode "Burns, Baby Burns" is first broadcast, guest starring Rodney Dangerfield. 
 November 24: The Simpsons episode "Bart After Dark" is first broadcast.

December
 December 1: The Simpsons episode "A Milhouse Divided" is first broadcast, where Milhouse's parents divorce.
 December 5: Frank Film is added to the National Film Registry.
 December 10: The first episode of Once Upon a Time... The Explorers airs.
 December 15: The Simpsons episode "Lisa's Date with Density" is first broadcast.
 December 20: The animated feature film Beavis and Butt-head Do America is released. It becomes a cult film.
 December 29: The Simpsons episode "Hurricane Neddy" is first broadcast, guest starring Jon Lovitz.

Films released 

 January 5 - City Hunter: The Secret Service (Japan)
 January 20 - Space Armageddon (South Korea)
 February 28 - The Secret of the Hunchback (United States)
 March 2:
 Doraemon: Nobita and the Galaxy Super-express (Japan)
 Dragon Ball: The Path to Power (Japan)
 March 19 - Gulliver's Travels (United States)
 March 23 - Pipi: Unforgettable Fireflies (Japan)
 March 29 - All Dogs Go to Heaven 2 (United States)
 April 1 - Cassiopéia (Brazil)
 April 2 - VeggieTales: Dave and the Giant Pickle (United States)
 April 12 - James and the Giant Peach (United States and United Kingdom)
 April 16 - The Hunchback of Notre Dame (United States)
 April 19 - Crayon Shin-chan: Adventure in Henderland (Japan)
 April 20:
 Dragon Quest Saga: Emblem of Roto (Japan)
 Lupin III: Dead or Alive (Japan)
 Tenchi the Movie: Tenchi Muyo in Love (Japan)
 April 30 - The Hunchback of Notre Dame (United States and Japan)
 May 1 - Sanctuary (Japan)
 June 1 - Miki Mol and the Terrible Cloak (Poland)
 June 21 - The Hunchback of Notre Dame (United States)
 June 23 - The Princess Castle (United States)
 June 27 -  (Germany)
 June 29 - The Nintama Rantarō Movie (Japan)
 July 6 - Jigoku Sensei Nūbē (Japan)
 July 13 - Soreike! Anpanman Soratobu Ehon to Garasu no Kutsu (Japan)
 July 19 - Yawara! Special – I've Always Been About You... (Japan)
 July 24 - Little Dinosaur Dooly (South Korea)
 July 26:
 Alì Babà (Italy)
 Odyssey Into the Mind's Eye (United States)
 August 2 - Lupin III: The Secret of Twilight Gemini (Japan)
 August 3:
 Slayers Return (Japan)
 X (Japan)
 August 13 - Aladdin and the King of Thieves (United States)
 August 21 - Advancer Tina (Japan)
 August 20 - Maya's Life (Japan)
 August 29 - Pepolino and the Treasure of the Mermaid (Germany, Hungary and Canada)
 August 30 - The Ballad of the Viking King, Holger the Dane (Denmark)
 September 6 - Shinran Shōnin to Ōsha-jō no Higeki (Japan)
 September 17 - Tom Thumb Meets Thumbelina (United States)
 September 25 - Ultraman: Super Fighter Legend – Comet Warrior God Tsuifon Appears (Japan)
 October 1:
 The Nome Prince and the Magic Belt (United States)
 Toto, Lost in New York (United States)
 Virtual Oz (United States)
 October 22 - VeggieTales: The Toy That Saved Christmas (United States)
 November - The Triumph of Time (Greece)
 November 15 - Space Jam (United States)
 November 30 - Black Jack: The Movie (Japan)
 December 5 - How the Toys Saved Christmas (Italy)
 December 7 - The Story of Santa Claus (United States)
 December 10 - The Land Before Time IV: Journey Through the Mists (United States)
 December 14:
 The File of Young Kindaichi (Japan)
 Spring and Chaos (Japan)
 December 15 - Christmas in Cartoontown (United States)
 December 20:
 Beavis and Butt-Head Do America (United States)
 Hugo: The Movie Star (Denmark, Sweden, Norway and Finland)
 December 24:
 The Adventures of Toad (United Kingdom)
 Santa Claus and the Magic Drum (Finland and Hungary)
 Specific date unknown:
 The 3 Little Pigs: The Movie (Canada)
 Against the Eagle and the Lion (Cuba and Spain)
 Beauty and the Beast (Australia)
 Christmas in Oz (United States)
 Cinderella (Australia)
 The Five Suns: A Sacred History of Mexico (United States)
 Hansel and Gretel (Australia)
 The Hunchback of Notre Dame (Australia)
 Kings and Cabbage (Russia)
 The Snow Queen's Revenge (United Kingdom)
 Who Stole Santa? (United States)

Television series debuts

Television series endings

Births

January
 January 15: Dove Cameron, American actress and singer (voice of Mal in the Descendants franchise, Gwen Stacy/Spider-Woman in Ultimate Spider-Man and Marvel Rising: Initiation, Ella in The Angry Birds Movie 2, Ellen Wright in Big Nate).
 January 26: Tati Gabrielle, American actress (voice of Willow Park in The Owl House, Addie McCallister in The Emoji Movie).

February
 February 28: Bobb'e J. Thompson, American actor, dancer, rapper and comedian (voice of Shortie #1 in Shark Tale, Cal Deveraux in Cloudy with a Chance of Meatballs, Lamilton Taeshawn in The Boondocks episode "Smokin' With Cigarettes").

March
 March 31: Liza Koshy, American internet personality and actress (voice of Zipp Storm in My Little Pony: A New Generation, Jinx in The Ghost and Molly McGee, Veronica Hill in Hamster & Gretel, herself in the Scooby-Doo and Guess Who? episode "The Internet On Haunted House Hill!").

April
 April 16: Anya Taylor-Joy, American actress (voice of Marla Brenner in Playmobil: The Movie, Princess Peach in The Super Mario Bros. Movie).

May
 May 14: James Rallison, American internet personality, cartoonist, animator and author (TheOdd1sOut, co-created and voiced himself in Oddballs).

June
 June 1: Tom Holland, English actor (voice of Walter Beckett in Spies in Disguise, Ian Lightfoot in Onward).

July
 July 16: Nicky Jones, American former child actor (voice of Flower in Bambi II, the title character in Chowder).

September
 September 1: Zendaya, American actress (voice of Meechee in Smallfoot, Lola Bunny in Space Jam: A New Legacy).
 September 12: Colin Ford, American actor (voice of Mikey in Can You Teach My Alligator Manners?, first voice of Jake in Jake and the Never Land Pirates).

November 
 November 22: Madison Davenport, American actress (voice of Quillo in Over the Hedge, Abel in the Legion of Super Heroes episode "Unnatural Alliances").

December 
 December 8: Teala Dunn, American actress and internet personality (voice of Tuck in Wonder Pets!, Bumblebee in DC Super Hero Girls, Panda-Mania and Random Citizen in the Spider-Man episode "Bring on the Bad Guys: Part One").
 December 9: Leah Lewis, American actress (voice of Cassandra Cain / Batgirl in Batwheels, Ember Lumen in Elemental).
 December 11
 Jack Griffo, American actor (voice of Blake Bradley in The Loud House, Robin in Batman and Superman: Battle of the Super Sons).
 Hailee Steinfeld, American actress and singer (voice of Anna Saski in When Marnie Was There, Gwen Stacy/Spider-Gwen in Spider-Man: Into the Spider-Verse and Spider-Man: Across the Spider-Verse, Vi in Arcane).

Deaths

February 
 February 2: 
 Shamus Culhane, American animator (J.R. Bray, Fleischer Studios, Ub Iwerks, Walt Disney Company, Warner Bros. Cartoons, Walter Lantz) and film director (The Barber of Seville), dies at age 87.
 Gene Kelly, American actor, singer, dancer, film director, producer and choreographer (danced with Jerry Mouse in Anchors Aweigh, choreography consultant for Cats Don't Dance), dies at age 83.
 February 3: Audrey Meadows, American actress (voice of Bea Simmons in The Simpsons episode "Old Money"), dies at age 73.
 February 13: Scott Beach, American actor (voice roles in Peanuts productions, original voice of Garfield), dies at age 65.

March 
 March 6: 
 Simon Cadell, English actor (voice of Blackberry in Watership Down), dies at age 45.
 Paula Winslowe, American actress (voice of Bambi's mother in Bambi), dies at age 85.
 March 15: Homer Groening, Saskatchewan-American filmmaker and father of Matt Groening (namesake for Homer Simpson, produced and directed "A Study in Wet" which was used as the logo for The Curiosity Company), dies at age 76.

April 
 April 17: Constantin Mustatea, American animator (Hanna-Barbera, Filmation, The Simpsons, Widget the World Watcher, Warner Bros. Animation), dies at age 68.
 April 25: Saul Bass, American graphic designer (swirling star logo for Hanna-Barbera), and filmmaker (Why Man Creates), dies at age 75.

May 
 May 8: Ed Love, American animator (Walt Disney Company, MGM (worked in Tex Avery's unit), Walter Lantz, Hanna-Barbera), dies at age 85.
 May 9: Carl Fallberg, American writer and cartoonist (Walt Disney Animation Studios, Hanna-Barbera, Warner Bros Cartoons), dies at age 80.
 May 10: Ethel Smith, American organist (played organ during the "Blame It on the Samba" segment in Melody Time), dies at age 93.
 May 15: Virgil Walter Ross, American animator (Charles B. Mintz, Ub Iwerks, Walter Lantz, Warner Bros. Cartoons, Filmation, Hanna Barbera), dies at age 88.
 May 24: John Abbott, English actor (voice of Akela in The Jungle Book), dies at age 90.

June 
 June 5: Vito Scotti, American actor (voice of Peppo in The Aristocats), dies at age 78.
 June 11: Gin, Spanish comics artist, animator and illustrator (Macian Studios), dies at age 65.

July 
 July 13: Tom Coppola, American layout artist (Hanna-Barbera, Filmation, The Simpsons, Tiny Toon Adventures, Taz-Mania), dies at age 50.
 July 15: Dana Hill, American voice actress (voice of Scrappy in Mighty Mouse: The New Adventures, Buddy in Adventures of the Gummi Bears, Tank Muddlefoot in Darkwing Duck, Max in Goof Troop, Jerry Mouse in Tom and Jerry: The Movie, Charles Duckman in Duckman), dies from a stroke at age 32.
 July 23: Jim Pabian, American animator, film director and comics artist (Warner Bros. Cartoons, Chuck Jones), dies at age 87.
 July 29: Sean Roberge, Canadian actor (voice of Chester McTech in Beverly Hills Teens, Tuxedo Sam in Hello Kitty's Furry Tale Theater, additional voices in Babar), dies in a car accident at age 23.

August 
 August 18: Al Bertino, American animator (Charles Mintz, Walt Disney Company, UPA, Grantray-Lawrence Animation, Walter Lantz), dies at age 84.

September 
 September 4: Victor Aaron, American actor (original voice of John Redcorn in King of the Hill), dies in a car accident at age 39.
 September 6: Gordon A. Sheehan, American animator and cartoonist (Fleischer Studios), dies at age 86.
 September 23: Fujiko F. Fujio, Japanese manga artist (Doraemon, Ninja Hattori-kun, Perman, Obake no Q-Taro), dies at age 62.

October 
 October 8: Morey Amsterdam, American actor, comedian, writer and producer (voice of narrator in Gay Purr-ee, Brady and James in Mister Magoo's Christmas Carol, One Million (O.M) in Rudolph's Shiny New Year), dies at age 87.

November 
 November 23: George Nicholas, American animator (Walter Lantz, Walt Disney Company, Hanna-Barbera), dies at age 85.
 November 30: Tiny Tim, American singer, ukulele player and musical archivist (performed the song "Livin' in the Sunlight, Lovin' in the Moonlight" which was used in the SpongeBob SquarePants episode "Help Wanted"), dies from cardiac arrest at age 64.

December 
 December 8: Stig Lasseby, Swedish animator, director,  animation producer (Agaton Sax, Peter-No-Tail) and voice actor (Tänkande August in the Agaton Sax films and TV series), dies at age 71.

Specific date unknown 
 Jim Davis, American animator and cartoonist (Walt Disney Company, Fleischer Studios, Warner Bros. Cartoons, DePatie-Freleng, worked on Fritz the Cat), dies at age 80 or 81.
 Rick Hoover, American animator (Walt Disney Company, Hanna-Barbera, Filmation) and comics artist, dies at age 55 or 56.
 Cor Icke, Dutch animator (directed Loeki de Leeuw), dies at age 82 or 83.

See also 
 1996 in anime

Sources

External links 
Animated works of the year, listed in the IMDb

 
1990s in animation